Graham is a city in Alamance County, North Carolina, United States. It is part of the Burlington, North Carolina Metropolitan Statistical Area. As of the 2020 census the population was 17,153. It is the county seat of Alamance County.

History 
Graham was laid out in 1849 as the county seat of the newly formed Alamance County, and was incorporated as a town in 1851; it became a city in 1961. It was named for William Alexander Graham, U.S. senator from North Carolina (1840–1843) and governor of North Carolina (1845–1849).

The lynching of Wyatt Outlaw, the first African-American Town Commissioner and Constable of Graham, on February 26, 1870, by the Ku Klux Klan, along with the assassination of State Senator John W. Stephens at the Caswell County Courthouse, provoked Governor William Woods Holden to declare martial law in Alamance and Caswell Counties, resulting in the Kirk-Holden War of 1870.

National Register of Historic Places
Alamance County Courthouse, Cedarock Park Historic District, Graham Historic District, William P. Morrow House, North Main Street Historic District, and Oneida Cotton Mills and Scott-Mebane Manufacturing Company Complex are listed on the National Register of Historic Places.

Geography
Graham is located at  (36.064486, -79.397941). It is bordered to the north and the west by the city of Burlington and to the northeast by the town of Haw River. The Haw River runs along the east edge of Graham, and the city extends south as far as Alamance Creek. Interstate 85 runs through the city, leading east to Durham and west to Greensboro.

Climate
The climate in this area is characterized by relatively high temperatures and evenly distributed precipitation throughout the year.  According to the Köppen Climate Classification system, Graham has a Humid subtropical climate, abbreviated "Cfa" on climate maps.

Education 
The local school system is known as the Alamance-Burlington School System, which was created by a merger between the Alamance County School System and the Burlington City School System in 1996.

Local public schools in Graham include:
 Southern Alamance High School
 Graham High School
 Graham Middle School
 Southern Middle School
 Alexander Wilson Elementary School
 B. Everett Jordan Elementary School
 North Graham Elementary School
 South Graham Elementary School

Private schools include:
Alamance Christian School

Graham is also home to Alamance Community College, a two-year technical college.

Demographics

2020 census

As of the 2020 United States census, there were 17,157 people, 6,412 households, and 3,962 families residing in the city.

2000 census
At the 2000 census there were 12,833 people, 5,241 households, and 3,385 families living in the city. The population density was 1,579.3 people per square mile (609.5/km). There were 5,685 housing units at an average density of 699.6 per square mile (270.0/km). The racial composition of the city was: 72.88% White, 21.64% Black or African American, 10.14% Hispanic or Latino American, 0.73% Asian American, 0.44% Native American, 0.0% Native Hawaiian or Other Pacific Islander, 3.19% some other race, and 1.12% two or more races.
Of the 5,241 households 29.9% had children under the age of 18 living with them, 44.0% were married couples living together, 16.2% had a female householder with no husband present, and 35.4% were non-families. 30.1% of households were one person and 11.8% were one person aged 65 or older. The average household size was 2.37 and the average family size was 2.91.

The age distribution was 24.0% under the age of 18, 9.9% from 18 to 24, 31.8% from 25 to 44, 20.1% from 45 to 64, and 14.1% 65 or older. The median age was 34 years. For every 100 females, there were 90.1 males. For every 100 females age 18 and over, there were 86.4 males.

The median household income was $35,706 and the median family income  was $40,769. Males had a median income of $27,844 versus $22,163 for females. The per capita income for the city was $17,865. About 11.9% of families and 14.9% of the population were below the poverty line, including 19.8% of those under age 18 and 14.9% of those age 65 or over.

References

External links
 City of Graham official website

Cities in North Carolina
Cities in Alamance County, North Carolina
County seats in North Carolina